Charles Peete (February 22, 1929 – November 27, 1956) was an American professional baseball player. The reigning  batting champion of the Triple-A American Association, who received a one-month, 23-game trial with the 1956 St. Louis Cardinals of Major League Baseball, Peete was projected by some as the leading candidate to be the Cardinals' 1957 starting center fielder, but he was killed in a commercial airplane crash near the Caracas, Venezuela, airport while flying to his winter-league baseball team in late November 1956.  Peete's wife, Nettie, and their three young children were also among the 25 victims of the crash.

Early career 
The native of Franklin, Virginia, began his professional career in the Negro leagues with the Indianapolis Clowns and played semi-professional baseball in Canada.

Peete was drafted by the Army in 1952 during the Korean War.  He served in Asia mainly with the Special Services Division playing football and baseball.  He was honorably discharged in 1953 after 15 months of service.

After his discharge, Peete signed with the unaffiliated Portsmouth, Virginia, Merrimacs of the mid-level, Class B Piedmont League; Peete was the first African-American to play in that league since the baseball color line was broken in 1946. He batted .275 in 125 games played for Portsmouth.

The Cardinals drafted Peete into their organization that offseason and assigned him to their Lynchburg Cardinals farm team, also in the Piedmont League, for 1954. Peete batted .311 with 17 home runs and was named to the PL all-star team. In 1956, he batted a league-best .350 with 16 home runs and 63 runs batted in in 116 games for Omaha.

St. Louis Cardinals 

Called up by the Cardinals in July, Peete made his debut July 17 in a home game against the Pittsburgh Pirates. Pinch hitting for veteran Hank Sauer, he drew a walk and stayed in the game to play center field, and later grounded into a double play in a 4–2 Cardinal loss. Peete collected ten hits in 52 at bats with two doubles and two triples. He was sent back to Omaha after his last MLB appearance, August 16, when he went hitless in three at bats against Lew Burdette of the Milwaukee Braves.

Plane crash in Venezuela 

Despite the disappointing results from his midseason callup, Peete was projected as a prime candidate for the Redbirds' 1957 centerfielder job; incumbent Bobby Del Greco had batted only .215 during 1956. Had Peete won the job, he would have been the Cardinals' first African-American regular starting player. To gain more experience, Peete decided to play winter baseball, and after drawing his release from a Cuban team because of a slow start, he joined the Valencia club in the Venezuelan league. Peete died at age 27; he and his family were on board Linea Aeropostal Flight 253 when the airliner crashed into Avila Mountain, near Caracas, during a rainstorm.

He became the first Major League Baseball player to die in Venezuela.

See also
 List of Negro league baseball players who played in Major League Baseball
 List of baseball players who died during their careers

References

External links

1929 births
1956 deaths
20th-century African-American sportspeople
Accidental deaths in Venezuela
African-American baseball players
American expatriate baseball players in Canada
Baseball players from Virginia
Brandon Greys players
Indianapolis Clowns players
Lynchburg Cardinals players
Major League Baseball center fielders
Omaha Cardinals players
People from Franklin, Virginia
Portsmouth Merrimacs players
Rochester Red Wings players
St. Louis Cardinals players
United States Army personnel of the Korean War
Victims of aviation accidents or incidents in 1956
Victims of aviation accidents or incidents in Venezuela